Lynne Edwards Parker is Associate Vice Chancellor and Director of the AI Tennessee Initiative at the University of Tennessee. Previously, she was Deputy United States Chief Technology Officer and Founding Director of the National Artificial Intelligence Initiative Office at the United States' White House Office of Science and Technology Policy. She is an American roboticist specializing in multi-robot systems, swarm robotics, and distributed artificial intelligence.

Education and career
Parker is originally from Knoxville, Tennessee. Following her older sister into technology, she majored in computer science at Tennessee Technological University, graduating in 1983. After a master's degree in computer science at the University of Tennessee in 1988, she completed her Ph.D. at the Massachusetts Institute of Technology in 1994. Her dissertation,  Heterogeneous Multi-Robot Cooperation, was supervised by Rodney Brooks.

She joined the Oak Ridge National Laboratory (ORNL) as a robotics researcher while she was a master's student, taking a leave for her doctorate. She moved from ORNL to the University of Tennessee in 2002. She was interim dean of the Tickle College of Engineering, before taking a leave from the faculty to join the White House Office of Science and Technology Policy in 2018. She was named founding director of the National Artificial Intelligence Initiative Office in 2021.

Recognition
Parker was named an IEEE Fellow in 2010, "for contributions to distributed and heterogeneous multi-robot systems".
She was named a Fellow of the Association for the Advancement of Artificial Intelligence in 2022, "for pioneering research in distributed robotics and exceptional leadership in AI policy". She is also a Fellow of the American Association for the Advancement of Science.

In 2014, Tennessee Tech gave her their Computer Scientist of Distinction Award.

In 2023, Computing Research Association awarded her the Distinguished Service Award for her unparalleled impact on the computing research community.

References

External links

Robotics History: Narratives and Networks Oral Histories: Lynne Parker, IEEE Robotics & Automation Society

Year of birth missing (living people)
Living people
American computer scientists
American women computer scientists
Tennessee Technological University alumni
University of Tennessee alumni
Massachusetts Institute of Technology alumni
Oak Ridge National Laboratory people
University of Tennessee faculty
Fellows of the Association for the Advancement of Artificial Intelligence
Fellow Members of the IEEE
Fellows of the American Association for the Advancement of Science